Micropteromyia is a genus of wood midges in the family Cecidomyiidae. The one described species - Micropteromyia ghilarovi - is only known from Russia. The genus was established by Boris Mamaev in 1960.

References

Cecidomyiidae genera

Taxa named by Boris Mamaev
Insects described in 1960
Monotypic Diptera genera